David Eade (born 4 September 1988) is a New Zealand rower.

At the 2010 World Rowing Championships, he won a bronze medal in the men's four partnering with Simon Watson, Hamish Burson, and Jade Uru.

References

1988 births
Living people
New Zealand male rowers
World Rowing Championships medalists for New Zealand